Justin Tissot (20 May 1902 – 17 September 1983) was a Swiss weightlifter. He competed in the men's featherweight event at the 1928 Summer Olympics.

References

External links
 

1902 births
1983 deaths
Swiss male weightlifters
Olympic weightlifters of Switzerland
Weightlifters at the 1928 Summer Olympics
Place of birth missing